64 Aquilae, abbreviated 64 Aql, is a star in the equatorial constellation of Aquila. 64 Aquilae is its Flamsteed designation. It is a faint star that requires good viewing conditions to see, having an apparent visual magnitude of 5.97. The distance to 64 Aql, as determined from its annual parallax shift of 2, is 152.2 light years. At that distance, the visual magnitude of the star is diminished by an extinction of 0.029 due to interstellar dust. It is moving closer to the Earth with a heliocentric radial velocity of −3.6 km/s.

This is an evolved giant star currently on the red giant branch with a stellar classification of K1 III/IV. The luminosity class of 'III/IV' indicates the spectrum shows a blend of features matching a subgiant and giant star. It is around 6.2 billion years old with 1.17 times the mass of the Sun and has expanded to 4.5 times the Sun's radius. The star is radiating 11 times the Sun's luminosity from its enlarged photosphere at an effective temperature of 4,786 K.

References

K-type subgiants
K-type giants
Aquila (constellation)
Durchmusterung objects
Aquilae, 64
191067
099171
7690